Pisolithus marmoratus is a species of gasteroid fungus.

Description
Appears as a roughly spherical fruiting-body mottled with shades of black, brown and gold and with a rough surface texture. Like other Pisolithus species it is sometimes described as resembling horse dung.

P. marmoratus has been sighted across the world in association with plants in the Myrtaceae family. It is native to Australia.

References

Fungi described in 1900
Fungi of Australia
Boletales